Paiement is a surname. Notable people with the surname include:

Alain Paiement (born 1960), Canadian artist
André Paiement (1950–1978), Canadian playwright and musician
Jonathan Paiement (born 1985), Canadian ice hockey player
Lucien Paiement (c. 1932 – 2013), Canadian physician and politician
Mahée Paiement (born 1976), Canadian actress
Pierre Paiement (born 1950), Canadian ice hockey player
Rachel Paiement (born 1955), Canadian musician and songwriter
Réal Paiement (born 1959), Canadian ice hockey player
Rosaire Paiement (born 1945), Canadian ice hockey player
Wilf Paiement (born 1955), Canadian ice hockey player